Michael Caussin (born February 26, 1987) is a former American football tight end. He was signed by the Jacksonville Jaguars as an undrafted free agent in 2010. He played college football at James Madison.

He also played for the Buffalo Bills, Jacksonville Jaguars and Washington Redskins.

Early life and education
Caussin was born in Springfield, Virginia. He attended West Springfield High School and has a younger brother, Jack. Following his high school graduation, Caussin attended James Madison University in Harrisonburg, Virginia, majoring in kinesiology with a sports management concentration.

Professional career

Jacksonville Jaguars
Caussin was signed by the Jacksonville Jaguars as an undrafted free agent in 2010. He was cut on September 4, 2010, but was signed to the Jaguars' practice squad on September 5, 2010.

Buffalo Bills
The Buffalo Bills signed Caussin off the Jaguars' practice squad on December 1, 2010. On August 14, 2013, he was waived by the Bills. On the next day, he cleared waivers and was placed on the Bills' injured reserve list.

On March 11, 2014, Caussin was re-signed by the Bills. He was waived on July 16.

Washington Redskins
The Washington Redskins signed Caussin on July 21, 2014. He was placed on the injured reserve on August 24.

Personal life
Caussin began dating actress and country singer Jana Kramer in August 2014, whom he met on Twitter. The couple became engaged on December 2, 2014, Kramer's 31st birthday. The two were married on May 22, 2015. On August 10, 2015, the couple revealed they were expecting their first child, a girl. Their daughter, Jolie Rae Caussin, was born on January 31, 2016, in Nashville. By August 2016, Kramer and Caussin had separated in the midst of Caussin's cheating and admission into rehab for sex addiction. They reconciled the following year and renewed their wedding vows in December 2017. In June 2018, Jana revealed they were expecting their second child, a boy. Their son, Jace Joseph Caussin, was born on November 29, 2018.

On April 20, 2021, Kramer filed for divorce from Caussin, citing "inappropriate marital conduct, irreconcilable differences and adultery". Two days after the pair split, a temporary restraining order was issued by the Williamson County, Tennessee court.

On May 20, 2021, it was reported that Kramer and Caussin reached an agreement with custody and child support. According to the documents, Kramer was awarded primary custody of Jolie and Jace. She will have the children 240 days out of the year, while Caussin will have them for the remaining 125 days. In addition, Kramer is to pay Caussin $3,200 per month in child support. The divorce was finalized on July 22, 2021.

References

External links
JMU Dukes football bio
Buffalo Bills bio

1987 births
Living people
People from Springfield, Virginia
Players of American football from Virginia
American football tight ends
James Madison Dukes football players
Jacksonville Jaguars players
Buffalo Bills players
Washington Redskins players
Sportspeople from Fairfax County, Virginia